Edwin Lee may refer to:

Edwin Gray Lee (1836–1870), American soldier and Confederate brigadier general during the American Civil War
Edwin Ferdinand Lee (1884–?), American Missionary Bishop of the Methodist Episcopal Church and the Methodist Church
Ed Lee (Edwin M. Lee, 1952–2017), mayor of San Francisco, California
Edwin Lee (footballer) (1879–?), English footballer

See also
Robert Edwin Lee (1918–1994), American playwright and lyricist
Walter Edwin Lees (1887–1957), American aviator